Djebock  is a small town and seat of the Commune of Anchawadi in the Cercle of Gao in the Gao Region of south-eastern Mali.

This town is detached to Mauguio in France.

Between 12–17 March 2013, a battle took place around the town as part of the Northern Mali conflict. It resulted in a French-Malian victory over jihadists.

References

Populated places in Gao Region